Kohimarama is a village on the northwest coast of Guadalcanal, Solomon Islands. The Bishop Patteson Theological College is in the village.

References

Populated places in Guadalcanal Province